Parodia mammulosa is a species of succulent plant in the family Cactaceae.

Description
Parodia mammulosa  is a perennial globose plant with flattened apex and a dark green surface, reaching a diameter of about 15 cm. The species shows about 18 vertical ribs with large pointed tubercles. The radial spines are about 12, needle-like, up to 1 cm long, while the single central spine reaches 2 cm. The flowers bloom in Spring and usually they are pale yellow, with a diameter of about 5 cm.

Distribution
This species is native to Argentina, Brazil (Rio Grande do Sul) and Uruguay.

Gallery

References
 Biolib
 Cactus-art
 Cacti Guide

mammulosa